No evidence of disease, or N.E.D., may refer to:

 A medical term for complete remission, mostly used in cancer-treatment
 N.E.D., a rock band composed of medical doctors
 No Evidence of Disease, a 2013 documentary about the band